The murder of Ori Ansbacher (also known as the Ein Yael attack) was a terror attack during which a Palestinian man raped and then murdered Ori Ansbacher, a 19-year-old young Israeli woman from Tekoa.

Background and attack
On , 11:00 AM, Ori's relatives reported her absence to the police. Ori volunteered at a youth center in Jerusalem and, according to friends, on the same day she had left the center agitated and went to seclude herself in nature, as she often liked to do. On 19:14 PM that day, her lifeless body was found by the police in the Ein Yael forest in the outskirts of Jerusalem, with signs of harsh violence.
On , a suspect for the murder named Arafat Irafaiya was arrested by the Israeli security forces in Ramallah. Irafaiya had a terrorist background and had spent time in an Israeli prison before the attack. He and his family are affiliated with Hamas.
Irafaiya admitted to raping and murdering Ori, saying that the attack wasn't planned aside from his purchasing of a kippa so that he could enter Israel undetected, adding "I entered Israel with a knife because I wanted to become a martyr and murder a Jew, I met the girl by chance”.

Trial 
Irfaiya, who was deemed fit to stand trial, pleaded guilty at the Jerusalem District Court to charges of first-degree murder with a terror motivation, rape and illegal entry into Israel.

Reactions
The murder and its gruesome details caused fury among the Israeli public. Rumors circulating that Ori was decapitated by the murderer caused the Israeli police to release an official statement denying such claims.                       

The murder drove the Israeli government to act on the issue of imprisoned Palestinian terrorists receiving monthly stipends from the Palestinian Authority. On , the Israeli security cabinet decided to enforce earlier legislation intended to deduct from money delivered by Israel to the Palestinian Authority the amount the Palestinian Authority pays to imprisoned terrorists, sparking outrage among Palestinian officials. Two of Irafaiya's family homes were later demolished by security forces.

The Jewish community in Gush Etzion planted dozens of trees in Ori's memory, which were later destroyed by Palestinian vandals.

See also
 Murder of Dvir Sorek (7 August 2019)
 Murder of Rina Shnerb (23 August 2019)

References

Terrorist incidents in Israel in 2019
Terrorist incidents involving knife attacks
2019 murders in Asia
February 2019 crimes in Asia
Palestinian terrorism
Terrorist incidents in Asia in 2019
Terrorist incidents in the West Bank in 2019
Terrorist incidents in Jerusalem in the 2010s
Rape in Asia
Violence against women in Israel